Patrik Petruška (born July 31, 1991) is a Czech professional ice hockey player. He played with HC Plzeň in the Czech Extraliga during the 2010–11 Czech Extraliga season.

References

External links 
 
 

1991 births
Living people
Czech ice hockey forwards
HC Plzeň players
Sportspeople from Plzeň
HC Berounští Medvědi players
IHC Písek players
HC Most  players